The 22901/22902 Bandra Terminus–Udaipur Superfast Express is a Superfast Express train belonging to Indian Railways that runs between Mumbai and Udaipur in India. It operates as train number 22901 from Bandra Terminus to Udaipur and as train number 22902 in the reverse direction.

Coaches

The 22901/22902 Bandra Terminus Udaipur Superfast Express presently has 1 AC 2 tier, 2 AC 3 tier, 6 Sleeper class, 2 General Unreserved, 2 Seating cum Luggage Rake coaches. As with most train services in India, coach composition may be amended at the discretion of Indian Railways depending on demand.

Service

22901 Bandra Terminus–Udaipur Superfast Express covers the distance of 945 kilometres in 16 hours 55 mins (57.27 km/hr).
22902 Udaipur–Bandra Terminus Superfast Express covers the distance of 945 kilometres in 16 hours 30 mins (58.76 km/hr).

As the average speed of the train is more than 55 km/hr, its fare includes a Superfast surcharge.

Route and halts 

The important halts of the train are:

Schedule

Traction
Now the route is fully electrified, it is hauled by Vadodara-based WAP-7 on its entire journey.

References 

Transport in Mumbai
Transport in Udaipur
Rail transport in Maharashtra
Rail transport in Gujarat
Rail transport in Madhya Pradesh
Rail transport in Rajasthan
Express trains in India
Railway services introduced in 2012